Shocked may refer to:

Shocked, to suffer an electric shock
Michelle Shocked  an American singer-songwriter
Shocked (film), a 1985 film starring Jodie Foster
"Shocked" (song), a 1990 song by Kylie Minogue
"Shocked", a 1982 song by Joe Cocker from Sheffield Steel
"Shocked", a 1988 song by Bros from Push

See also
 Shock (disambiguation)